BookRenter was an American online textbook rental company based in San Mateo, California.

History
BookRenter started the first online textbook rental service in 2006. Colin Barceloux founded the company as a startup in Silicon Valley after raising funds from Storm Ventures and Adams Capital.

The idea behind BookRenter came from the frustration associated with buying high-cost textbooks when the founder, Barceloux attended Santa Clara University. He teamed up with two engineer majors, Chris Williams and Philippe Huibonhoa to help him with the building BookRenter.com. The website launched to offer textbook rentals for less than the retail price. BookRenter expanded its operation by partnering with over 500 college bookstores by setting up a virtual rental store on their own websites. In 2010, it reportedly served 6 million students on over 5,000 campuses in the US.

In 2009, Mehdi Maghsoodnia became CEO of the company, replacing Colin Barceloux. In 2010, Netflix co-founder Marc Randolph joined the board of directors.

In early 2012, BookRenter was rebranded as Rafter Inc. after introducing its cloud-based course materials management services to colleges and universities. Through the cloud-based platform, students could obtain course materials and college administrators, professors access and manage their educational materials.

In 2014, BookRenter partnered with Staples to expand its textbook rental service delivered through Staples.com.
 

In May 2017, the company was acquired by eCampus.com.

Finances
BookRenter initially received financing from several venture capital firms in Silicon Valley. In 2009, it announced a Series A round of $6 million, raised from Storm Ventures and Adams Capital Management, then Norwest Venture Partners led the Series B round of $10 million, which included participation from prior investors Storm Ventures and Adams Capital Management.   

In 2011, Bookrenter raised $40 million in funding from its investors including Storm Ventures, Adams Capital Management, Comerica Bank, Lighthouse Capital Partners, Norwest Venture Partners and Focus Ventures.

Awards and recognition
BookRenter received an Interactive Media Award for "Outstanding Achievement in Ecommerce" in 2008. It was the recipient of About.com’s 2012 Reader Choice Award for "Best Site for Renting Textbooks".

See also
 Amazon Kindle#Textbook rentals
 Google Play Books#Books on Google Play
 Chegg

References

2006 establishments in California
Book rental
Book selling websites
Educational technology companies of the United States
Education companies established in 2006
Retail companies established in 2006
Internet properties established in 2006
Online retailers of the United States
Textbook business